Atomaria mesomela is a species of silken fungus beetle native to Europe.

References

External links
Images representing Atomaria at BOLD

Cryptophagidae
Beetles described in 1793
Beetles of Europe